RBQ may refer to:

 Round Britain Quiz, a panel game that has been broadcast on BBC Radio since 1947
 Rurrenabaque Airport (IATA airport code RBQ), Bolivia